Sir Frank Utu Ofagioro Kabui, GCMG, CSI, OBE KStJ (born 19 April 1946) was the Governor General of the Solomon Islands from 7 July 2009 to 7 July 2019.

He is also a trained judge, having been his country's first law graduate in 1975, and is a former member of the Solomon Islands Bar Association (SIBA), having twice served as its president.

Career

Legal career 

Kabui was born on 19 April 1946. He is a former High Court judge and Attorney General. He was twice elected President of the Solomon Islands Bar Association, the second time in 2007 to succeed Ranjit Hewagama.  Whereas David Campbell was the Solomon Islands' first local lawyer, Kabui was the country's first law graduate upon completing his studies at the University of Papua New Guinea in 1975. Kabui also served as Chairman of the Law Reform Commission.

Political career

2009 nomination 

Kabui was nominated by the National Parliament to become Governor General after the fourth round with thirty votes. The Chairman of the Public Service Commission, Edmund Andresen, received eight votes while Kabui's predecessor, Nathaniel Waena, received seven. Three members were not present. The list of candidates also included former Prime Minister and current Speaker of Parliament Peter Kenilorea and five other candidates. Following the completion of this nomination process in Parliament, the formal appointment as Governor-General was then issued by Elizabeth II, Queen of Solomon Islands. His election came as the country celebrated thirty-one years of independence.

Kabui attended a ceremony at the Lawson Tama Stadium on 7 July 2009, where several thousand people saw him take his oath. He inspected a guard of honour by the Royal Solomon Islands Police and received the royal salute during a parade.

On 8 July 2009 in Honiara, Kabui presented an award to athlete Jim Marau, who was Solomon Islands first South Pacific Games gold medallist, achieving this feat in 1975. Marau was awarded during the Independence Celebration in Lawson Tama.

On 9 October 2009, Kabui was appointed a Knight Grand Cross of the Order of St Michael and St George.

References 

1946 births
Governors-General of Solomon Islands
Knights Grand Cross of the Order of St Michael and St George
Living people
Officers of the Order of the British Empire
20th-century Solomon Islands lawyers
Solomon Islands judges
University of Papua New Guinea alumni